Sing Bing Kang is an American Interactive Visual Media Group and principal researcher at Microsoft Research. There, he is writing articles related to computer graphics which come are being published by the International Journal of Computer Vision and many others. He is a co-editor of two books; Panoramic Vision: Sensors, Theory, and Applications which he did with R. Benosman, and the Emerging Topics in Computer Vision with G. Medioni being the main editor. Besides editing and publishing, he was also a co-author of two books; Image-Based Rendering and Image-Based Modeling of Plants and Trees.

References

Living people
20th-century births
American computer specialists
Microsoft Research people
Year of birth missing (living people)